William Scott Gardner (born March 19, 1960) is a Canadian former professional ice hockey forward and current color commentator for the Chicago Wolves. He played in the National Hockey League with the Chicago Blackhawks and Hartford Whalers between 1980 and 1989.

Career
Gardner was born in Toronto, Ontario. During the 1976–77 season, Gardner played for the Seneca Nationals alongside future all-time NHL points leader Wayne Gretzky. Gardner won the team's Most Valuable Player award that season, scoring 103 points as a defensemen. Gardner then went on to play for the OHL's Peterborough Petes, where in 1979, the Petes would go on to win the Memorial Cup. Gardner was drafted 49th Overall by the Chicago Blackhawks, just one pick after Mark Messier. Gardner started his National Hockey League career with the Chicago Blackhawks in 1981. He would spend his entire career with the Blackhawks except for 26 games he played for the Hartford Whalers in 1986. During his career, he scored 73 goals, 115 assists, 188 points in 380 games.

Gardner's career as a broadcaster began in 1989 as a studio analyst on SportsChannel Chicago's Blackhawks broadcasts. In 1996, he replaced Daryl Reaugh on Hartford Whalers television broadcasts when Reaugh left to become radio analyst for the Dallas Stars when it looked as if the Whalers might leave Hartford . He followed the Whalers to North Carolina when the team relocated the next season, but left after one season return to the Chicago Blackhawks as the team's color analyst on television and radio.  Gardner served as color commentator for the Blackhawks alongside Pat Foley until 2002. He has been the color analyst for the Chicago Wolves since 2002.

He lives in Elmhurst, Illinois.

Career statistics

Regular season and playoffs

International

External links
 

1960 births
Living people
Binghamton Whalers players
Canadian expatriate ice hockey players in Austria
Canadian ice hockey centres
Carolina Hurricanes announcers
Chicago Blackhawks announcers
Chicago Blackhawks draft picks
Chicago Blackhawks players
Dallas Stars announcers
EC Graz players
EC Kapfenberg players
Hartford Whalers announcers
Hartford Whalers players
Ice hockey people from Toronto
Innsbrucker EV players
National Hockey League broadcasters
New Brunswick Hawks players
Peterborough Petes (ice hockey) players
Saginaw Hawks players